Fernando Maestro Olalla (born 15 April 1974) is a Spanish retired footballer who played as a goalkeeper.

Club career
Born in Sant Cugat del Vallès, Barcelona, Catalonia, Maestro spent the vast majority of his 21-year senior career in Segunda División B, representing a host of clubs including CE L'Hospitalet and UE Sant Andreu for which he had two different spells each. His Segunda División input consisted of 18 matches with Terrassa FC in two separate seasons – his first game in the competition occurring on 31 August 2002 in a 1–1 home draw against Albacete Balompié in which he was sent off– and 29 for CD Alcoyano in 2011–12 (team relegation).

Maestro retired in 2013 at the age of 39, after a spell with amateurs CD Corralejo. He subsequently became a goalkeepers' coach.

References

External links

1974 births
Living people
People from Sant Cugat del Vallès
Sportspeople from the Province of Barcelona
Spanish footballers
Footballers from Catalonia
Association football goalkeepers
Segunda División players
Segunda División B players
Tercera División players
CE L'Hospitalet players
FC Barcelona Atlètic players
UE Sant Andreu footballers
Gimnàstic de Tarragona footballers
Ontinyent CF players
RCD Espanyol B footballers
CF Gandía players
Terrassa FC footballers
CD Alcoyano footballers
Spain youth international footballers